César Osuna (born 11 December 1948) is a Mexican volleyball player. He competed in the men's tournament at the 1968 Summer Olympics.

References

1948 births
Living people
Mexican men's volleyball players
Olympic volleyball players of Mexico
Volleyball players at the 1968 Summer Olympics
People from Tecate
Sportspeople from Baja California